St. Louis Metro-East Airport , also known as Shafer Field, is a private use airport located two miles (3 km) north of the central business district of St. Jacob, in Madison County, Illinois, United States. It is privately owned by Edward B. Shafer.

Facilities and aircraft 

For the 12-month period ending August 31, 2018, the airport had 52,000 aircraft operations, an average of 142 per day: 98% general aviation and 2% air taxi. At that time there were 2 aircraft based at this airport: 1 glider and 1 ultralight.

Accidents and incidents
On July 2, 2022, a Piper Comanche 250 crashed after takeoff from Metro-East. One passenger died at the scene, while the pilot was taken to the hospital with critical injuries. The cause of the crash is under investigation.

References

External links 

Airports in Illinois
Transportation buildings and structures in Madison County, Illinois
Privately owned airports